Eugenia ekmanii is a species of plant in the family Myrtaceae. It is found in Haiti and Jamaica. It is threatened by habitat loss.

References

ekmanii
Vulnerable plants
Taxonomy articles created by Polbot